Lisanby may refer to:
Charles Alvin Lisanby, an American Production Designer who helped define scenic design in early color television
Gladys Kemp Lisanby, patron of the arts and philanthropist
James Lisanby, Rear Admiral, United States Navy, Engineer
Sarah H. Lisanby, psychiatrist, academic and NIH official